Bucknall is a suburb of Stoke-on-Trent in the county of Staffordshire.

It was recorded in the Domesday Book as having a taxable value of 0.3 geld and consisting of three ploughlands.

Mitchell High School was a comprehensive school located in Bucknall that educated pupils of ages 11–16. The school was merged with Edensor High School in Longton in 2011 to form Discovery Academy, with the new school relocating to a new site in Bentilee in 2013.

Ash Hall Golf Club (now defunct) first appeared in the mid 1920s. It continued until WW2.

Notable people 
 Hugh Bourne (1772–1852) joint founder of Primitive Methodism, the largest offshoot of Wesleyan Methodism was born at Ford Hayes Farm, Ford Hayes Lane, Bucknall
 Arthur Prince (1902–1980) an English footballer who played 102 games in the Football League
 Tommy Cheadle (1919–1993) an English footballer, played 333 games for Port Vale
 Stan Turner (1926–1991) an English footballer, made 246 appearances for Port Vale
 Garth Crooks OBE (born 1958) an English former professional footballer. He currently works for BBC Sport as the lead pundit on Final Score on BBC One on Saturday afternoons.

References

Areas of Stoke-on-Trent